Khristian Petkov Minkovski (born October 24, 1971 in Sofia) is a retired butterfly swimmer from Bulgaria. He was a member of the Bulgarian National Swimming Team (four men and one woman) at the 1992 Summer Olympics in Barcelona, Spain. He didn't reach the finals in the men's 100 m butterfly (45th place) and the men's 200 m butterfly (35th place).

References

1971 births
Living people
Male butterfly swimmers
Bulgarian male swimmers
Olympic swimmers of Bulgaria
Swimmers at the 1992 Summer Olympics
Sportspeople from Sofia